= Christian Labeau =

Belgian actor and director

Christian Labeau was a Belgian actor and director. He died on October 31, 2024, at the age of 71. He played more than 200 roles, mostly in theatre.
